André Fernando Cabrita Salvador (born 4 November 1993) is a Portuguese footballer who plays for CF Canelas 2010 as a midfielder.

Football career
On 4 August 2013, Salvador made his professional debut with Portimonense S.C. in a 2013–14 Taça da Liga match against Trofense, when he replaced Bruno González in the 78th minute.

References

External links

Stats and profile at LPFP 

1993 births
People from Portimão
Living people
Portuguese footballers
Association football midfielders
S.C. Braga players
Merelinense F.C. players
Portimonense S.C. players
Vilaverdense F.C. players
Leixões S.C. players
F.C. Arouca players
Real S.C. players
Campeonato de Portugal (league) players
Liga Portugal 2 players
Sportspeople from Faro District